Fay is an Irish surname that also arose independently in France. There are different theories about the origin and meaning of the surname.

Origin

French / Norman

The name may have originally derived from the Norman surname "de Fae", which has several possible origins. The first and oldest origin is locational, stemming from the Old French "fage", which is derived from the Latin "Fagus", referring to a "place of beech trees". Other claims are that Fae stems from the Old French "fae", meaning magical, enchanted, or otherworldly, or from the Anglo-French "fei" meaning faithfulness to a trust or promise; loyalty to a person; honesty, truthfulness. The name was introduced to England and Ireland in the 12th and 13th centuries through the Norman conquest and settlement of both regions.

The Viscounts De La Faye and Du Fai, from whom the later variants stem, originated in Sainte-Honorine-du-Fay in Normandy. The first recorded appearance of the name in England was Radulphus de Fae, who was granted a manor extension in Surrey by Henry II in 1154. The first appearance in Ireland was Richard de Fae, a knight who settled in the Lordship of Meath in 1219.

The Norman-derived variant of Fay is the most common origin of the name in Ireland, and is predominantly found in counties Westmeath, Cavan and Monaghan. However, the surname also arose independently in Ireland from the Anglicisation of two Gaelic surnames.

Irish
In Ireland, Fay may also represent Anglicised forms of the Gaelic surnames Ó Fiaich meaning 'descendant of Fiach' (a nickname meaning 'raven', but is sometimes mistranslated as 'Hunt' as a result of confusion with fiach, the modern spelling of fiadhach 'hunt') and Ó Fathaigh meaning  'descendant of Fathadh’ (a personal name derived from fothadh 'base' or 'foundation', but is sometimes mistranslated as Green as a result of erroneous association with faithche 'lawn').

Other origins
The Serer surname Faye may also be spelled as Fay in Serer proper. It is unrelated to the Irish and French surname and pronounced differently.

Notable people
Notable people with the surname include:

Performers
 Bill Fay (born 1943), English singer
 Dorothy Fay (1915–2003), American actress
 Faith Fay (born 1987), American actress
 Frank Fay (American actor) (1897–1961), American Vaudeville performer
 Bob Fay, American Drummer/ Songwriter
 Frank Fay (Irish actor) (1870–1931), Irish co–founder of the Abbey Theatre
 Isabel Fay (born 1979), British actor
 Johnny Fay (born 1966), Canadian drummer
 Martin Fay (1938–2012), Irish fiddler
 Meagen Fay, American actress
 Rick Fay (1926–1999), American clarinetist
 William Fay (1872–1947), Irish actor

Politicians
 Charles Joseph Fay, Irish politician
 Francis B. Fay (1793–1876), American politician
 Fred Fay (1944–2011), American disability rights activist
 James H. Fay (1899–1948), American lawyer
 John Fay (1773–1855), American politician
 Paul B. Fay (1918–2009), United States Secretary of the Navy
 Peter T. Fay (1929-2021), American lawyer and judge

Others
 Brian Fay (born 1943), American philosopher
 Charles Ernest Fay (1846–1931), American mountain climber
 Daisy Fay maiden name of Daisy Buchanan in F. Scott Fitzgerald's The Great Gatsby
 Darren Fay (born 1976), Irish footballer
 George Fay, United States Army general
 J. Michael Fay (born 1956), American ecologist
 James Bernard Fay (born 1947), Canadian farmer
 John Fay, British television writer
 John D. Fay (1815–1895), American civil engineer
 Larry Fay (1888–1933), American businessperson
 Lydia Mary Fay (1804–1878), American missionary, educator, writer, and translator
 Marianne Fay, American economist and writer
 Maura Fay (1958–2001), Australian television producer
 Michael Fay (born 1947), New Zealand businessperson
 Michael D. Fay, American war and combat artist
 Michael Francis Fay (born 1960), British Botanist and Geneticist
 Michael P. Fay (born 1975), American–Singaporean vandal 
 Ming Fay, American sculptor
 Peter W. Fay (1924–2004), American historian
 Randy Fay, American software developer
 Sam Fay (1856–1953), English railwayman
 Sidney Bradshaw Fay (1876–1967), American historian

See also

 de Fay
 de la Fay
 du Fay
 Fahey
 Faye (surname)
 Faye family

References

Surnames of Irish origin